DXEL (95.5 FM), broadcasting as Magic 95.5, is a radio station owned by Golden Broadcast Professionals Inc. and operated by Quest Broadcasting Inc. It is the partner station of Tiger 22 Media. Its studios are located at GBPI Building, Campaner St., Zamboanga City.

Profile
The station was launched in June 1993 as Gold FM. In 2000, Quest Broadcasting took over the station's operations and renamed it as Killerbee. On April 29, 2013, DXEL, along with other Killerbee stations, was relaunched under the Magic brand (adopted from Quest's parent station).

Aside from its regular programming, Magic 95.5 also airs the simulcast of Dateline TeleRadyo from sister TV station TV11.

References

Radio stations established in 1993
Contemporary hit radio stations in the Philippines
Radio stations in Zamboanga City
Quest Broadcasting